DS4, DS-4, or variant, may refer to:

 DS 4, the DS-branded Citroen DS4 car
 Datsun DS-4, the Datsun (Nissan) car
 Sony DualShock 4, PlayStation 4 game controller
 DS4, a digital signal designation for 274.176 Mbit/s 4032-channel T4 lines, see Digital Signal Designation
 Dalit Shoshit Samaj Sangharsh Samiti (DS-4 or DSSSS) political organization in India

See also
 4DS
 Ds4 Windows